Gyulmirza (also, Gyul’mirza) is a village in the Imishli Rayon of Azerbaijan.

References 

Populated places in Imishli District